Polastron may refer to:

 Lucien Polastron (born 1944), a French writer and historian
 Yolande de Polastron (1749–1793), French noblewoman and royal favorite
 Polastron, Gers, a commune in the Gers département, in France
 Polastron, Haute-Garonne, a commune in the Haute-Garonne département, in France